Dokdonella immobilis is a Gram-negative, rod-shaped, non-endospore-forming and non-motile bacterium from the genus of Dokdonella which has been isolated from a batch reactor.

References

External links
Type strain of Dokdonella immobilis at BacDive -  the Bacterial Diversity Metadatabase

Xanthomonadales
Bacteria described in 2009